Bob Samaras (August 16, 1927 - February 21, 2018) was a basketball coach at Eastern High School in Detroit and later at the University of Windsor. He was also the author of the book Blitz Basketball in which he laid out the plan for playing basketball in a manner that would latter be termed a Full-court press.

Samaras is Greek Orthodox and spent most of his adult life living in St. Clair Shores, Michigan.

Samaras also wrote the book Mom, I'll Stop Crying if You Stop Crying.

Sources
 St. Theotokos website
 University of Windsor sports hall of fame website
 Open Library listing of books by Samaras
Obituary

1927 births
2018 deaths
American men's basketball coaches
American male writers
Basketball coaches from Michigan
High school basketball coaches in the United States
People from St. Clair Shores, Michigan
Sportspeople from Metro Detroit
Academic staff of University of Windsor
Wayne State Warriors men's basketball coaches
Writers from Detroit